Valley of the Stereos is a 1992 New Zealand short film written by Costa Botes and George Port and produced by Jim Booth and Peter Jackson.

Plot

Valley of the Stereos involves an escalating battle between a hippie ('River', played by Danny Mulheron) and a metalhead (Murray Keane) who live next door to each other in the countryside. Following the metalhead's late-night music playing, the two battle over who can drive the other away with their incompatible music tastes. Each accumulates a larger and larger pile of stereos, until eventually River converts his house into a multi-stereo mecha and (accidentally) blasts both homes out of existence.

Cast
Danny Mulheron as River
Murray Keane

External links 
 

1992 comedy films
1992 films
1992 short films
New Zealand short films
Comedy short films
1990s English-language films
Films produced by Peter Jackson